The 1959 New York Yankees season was the 57th season for the team. The team finished in third place in the American League with a record of 79–75, 15 games behind the Chicago White Sox. New York was managed by Casey Stengel. The Yankees played their home games at Yankee Stadium.

Offseason
 Prior to 1959 season: Elvio Jiménez was signed as an amateur free agent by the Yankees.

Regular season

Season standings

Record vs. opponents

Notable transactions 
 April 13, 1959: Bobby Del Greco was purchased from the Yankees by the Philadelphia Phillies.
 May 26, 1959: Johnny Kucks, Tom Sturdivant, and Jerry Lumpe were traded by the Yankees to the Kansas City Athletics for Ralph Terry and Héctor López.
 September 11, 1959: Enos Slaughter was selected off waivers from the Yankees by the Milwaukee Braves.

Roster

Player stats

Batting

Starters by position 
Note: Pos = Position; G = Games played; AB = At bats; H = Hits; Avg. = Batting average; HR = Home runs; RBI = Runs batted in

Other batters 
Note: G = Games played; AB = At bats; H = Hits; Avg. = Batting average; HR = Home runs; RBI = Runs batted in

Pitching

Starting pitchers 
Note: G = Games pitched; IP = Innings pitched; W = Wins; L = Losses; ERA = Earned run average; SO = Strikeouts

Other pitchers 
Note: G = Games pitched; IP = Innings pitched; W = Wins; L = Losses; ERA = Earned run average; SO = Strikeouts

Relief pitchers 
Note: G = Games pitched; W = Wins; L = Losses; SV = Saves; ERA = Earned run average; SO = Strikeouts

Farm system 

LEAGUE CHAMPIONS: Modesto, St. Petersburg

Notes

References 
1959 New York Yankees at Baseball Reference
1959 New York Yankees team page at www.baseball-almanac.com

New York Yankees seasons
New York Yankees
New York Yankees
1950s in the Bronx